The Kleiner Mythen is a mountain in the Schwyzer Alps of Central Switzerland. The mountain lies in the canton of Schwyz, to the east of the town of Schwyz, to the south of the village of Alpthal in the valley of the Alp river, and to the north of the Grosser Mythen.

References

External links 
 Kleiner Mythern on Hikr

Mountains of the Alps
Mountains of Switzerland
Mountains of the canton of Schwyz
One-thousanders of Switzerland

la:Mythen
eo:Mythen